Tan Wee Beng (born 14 February 1977) is a Singaporean businessman and commodity broker currently on a most wanted list maintained by the United States Federal Bureau of Investigation (FBI) for money laundering.

Career

Business
A graduate of Nanyang Technological University, Singapore, Tan serves as the director of Wee Tiong and the managing director of WT Marine. In 2011, he was named the Emerging Entrepreneur of the Year by Ernst & Young. Under his leadership, annual revenue at Wee Tiong reportedly grew by some 131 percent in ten years to more than USD$300m in 2015.

Alleged money laundering
On 25 October 2018, the United States Department of Justice officially filed charges against Tan for his "conspiring to use the U.S. financial system to conduct millions of dollars’ worth of transactions to finance shipments of goods to the Democratic People’s Republic of Korea". At the same time, the United States Department of the Treasury announced sanctions against Tan and the two companies under his leadership. Tan categorically denied the criminal allegations.

Personal life
The South China Morning Post described Tan as a "Ferrari-loving entrepreneur" based on his alleged penchant for sports cars. According to his Business Times profile, Tan is also a member of the London-based Refined Sugar Association.

References

External links
 FBI Profile

1977 births
People from Singapore
Nanyang Technological University alumni
Singaporean businesspeople
Living people